is a ward of the city of Sakai in Osaka Prefecture, Japan. The ward has an area of 40.44 km² and a population of 155,266. The population density is 3,839 per square kilometer. The name means "South Ward."

The wards of Sakai were established when Sakai became a city designated by government ordinance on April 1, 2006.

Education

Universities and colleges
 Tezukayama Gakuin University Izumigaoka Campus
 St. Andrew's University of Education
 Osaka Junior College of Social Health and Welfare

Transportation

Rail 

 Semboku Rapid Railway Corporation
 Semboku Rapid Railway: Izumigaoka Station - Toga-Mikita Station - Kōmyōike Station

Road 

 Hanwa Expressway (Sakai Interchange)

References

External links

Ward office official webpage 

Wards of Sakai, Osaka